An uppercase (C) (parenthetical C) may refer to:
 Copyright symbol (©)
 Classified information in the United States#Confidential
 Joint Electronics Type Designation System#Parenthetical C, indicating NSA-controlled cryptographic/classified items

See also
 Circle-c (disambiguation)
 Copyright symbol (disambiguation)
 C (disambiguation)